"Iesha" is the debut single by Another Bad Creation, from the album Coolin' at the Playground Ya Know!  Released on October 2, 1990, the song reached #9 on the Billboard Hot 100 chart and #6 on the R&B chart.

Track listings
US Vinyl, 12" 
1 Iesha [LP Version] 4:20
2 Iesha [Stupid Club 12" Mix] 7:13
3 Iesha [Mental Mix] 4:21

UK 	Vinyl, 12" 
1 Iesha [Stupid Club 12" Mix] 7:13
2 Iesha [7" Version] 3:10
3 Iesha [House Mix] 4:19
4 Iesha [After Hours Mix] 4:19
5 Iesha [After Hours Instrumental] 4:26

Charts

Weekly charts

Year-end charts

Certifications

References

1990 debut singles
Another Bad Creation songs
Songs written by Dallas Austin
Songs written by Michael Bivins
1990 songs
Motown singles